The 1944 Rose Bowl was the thirtieth edition of the college football bowl game, played at the Rose Bowl in Pasadena, California, on Saturday, January 1. This was the only Rose Bowl game with teams from the same conference (Pacific Coast), necessitated by the travel restrictions imposed by the war effort. It determined the champion of the PCC for the 1943 season and the USC Trojans shut out the Washington Huskies 29–0 in a one-sided game.

USC backup quarterback Jim Hardy threw three touchdown passes to lead the Trojans to their seventh Rose Bowl victory and eighth PCC championship.

For the first time, the Rose Bowl was broadcast on the radio abroad to all American servicemen, with General Eisenhower in Western Europe allowing all troops who were not on the front lines to tune in and listen.

Teams

Washington Huskies

Favored Washington won all four of its games in an abbreviated season without any PCC matchups, as the other five programs in the Northern Division were on hiatus in 1943 (and 1944). They played Whitman College, Spokane Air Command (twice), and the March Field Flyers. The Rose Bowl was the Huskies' sole conference game of the season; the three teams of the Southern Division (USC, UCLA, California) played each other twice; Stanford was on hiatus until the 1946 season.

Washington's most recent game was two months earlier on October 30, and they had lost a dozen players to active military duty since, including two of their best backs, Jay Stoves (a transfer from idle Washington State) and Pete Susick. Head coach Ralph Welch filled roster holes with Navy V-12 trainees and draft rejects who recently arrived on campus, leaving only 28 players available for the game. Oddsmakers made the Huskies two-touchdown favorites to beat USC, but the fielded team differed greatly from that of the regular season.

USC Trojans

Scoring

First quarter
No scoring

Second quarter
 USC – George Callanan, 11-yard pass from Jim Hardy (Dick Jamison kick good); USC leads 7–0

Third quarter
 USC – Callanan, 10-yard pass from Hardy (Jamison kick good); USC leads 14–0
 USC – Gordon Gray, 21-yard pass from Hardy (Jamison kick blocked); USC leads 20–0

Fourth quarter
 USC – Gray, 36-yard pass from Ainslee Bell (Jamison kick good); USC leads 27–0
 USC – Gerry Austin’s punt blocked and rolled into the end zone for a safety; USC leads 29–0

References

Rose Bowl
Rose Bowl Game
USC Trojans football bowl games
Washington Huskies football bowl games
Rose Bowl
Rose Bowl